"Don't Let Me Get Me" is a song by American singer Pink. It was released as the second single from her second studio album, Missundaztood (2001) on February 18, 2002. "Don't Let Me Get Me" received positive reviews from music critics, who praised the tone of the song. Commercially, it was a success, becoming Pink's fifth single to chart within the top ten on the US Billboard Hot 100, rising to number eight, and it was her first number one on the Billboard Mainstream Top 40 chart. Outside the US, the song became Pink's second consecutive number-one single in New Zealand and reached the top ten in 14 other countries, including Australia, Ireland, Sweden, and the United Kingdom. A music video promoting the single was filmed and released in January 2002.

Composition
"Don't Let Me Get Me" is set in the key of E major in common time with a tempo of 98 beats per minute. The song moves at a chord progression of E–Cm–B–A, and Pink's vocals span from E3 to B4.

Reception
"Don't Let Me Get Me" reached number one in New Zealand, number six in the United Kingdom and number eight in Australia and the United States.

The song earned positive reports from music critics, but most  gave sensitively mixed reviews upon her self-hating lyrical content. Robert Christgau in his consumer guide for MSN wrote that "Despite Pink's audacious claim that she's not as pretty as 'damn Britney Spears,' celebrity anxiety takes a backseat to a credible personal pain rooted in credible family travails, a pain held at bay by expression." Jim Farber of Entertainment Weekly wrote that "In Don't Let Me Get Me, she turns self-loathing into a perverse kind of anthem."

Jason Thompson of PopMatters wrote, "on the power rock of 'Don’t Let Me Get Me,' Pink herself tells it like it is and attempts to break free from the image making machine. 'Tired of being compared / To damn Britney Spears / She’s so pretty / That just ain’t me.' Well, that’s debatable in itself, but the fact that Pink takes it upon herself to call Spears out should be nothing short of revelatory. Spears certainly has nothing on Pink in the vocal department. Pink can actually sing. And damn well, mind you."

Jim Alexander wrote a negative review, saying that the rest of Missundaztood is full of bad songs and that "'Don't Let Me Get Me' and 'Dear Diary' see all pop joy expunged for acoustic seriousness, dreary unobtrusive beats and lyrics about relationship woes and record company badness."

Music video
Filmed and released in January 2002, the music video for "Don't Let Me Get Me" was shot by director Dave Meyers. It depicts Pink as a high school student, in various scenes in which her nonconformity causes conflict with other students and school officials. A similarly-themed scene depicts her meeting with music executive L.A. Reid, who tells her that in order to obtain stardom, she will have to change everything about her persona, in order to exhibit a greater resemblance to Britney Spears, despite Pink's insistence that that is not how she sees herself. Yet another scene shows her modeling for the cover of a magazine, irritated at how she is being made up by the lighting technicians, makeup artists and other personnel involved in the shoot. The video then shifts to a scene in which Pink, now in control over her career, is welcomed back to her high school for a concert there.

Track listings

US and European DVD single
 "Don't Let Me Get Me" (video)
 "Get the Party Started" (video)
 "Get the Party Started" (behind the scenes footage)
 Photo gallery

UK CD single
 "Don't Let Me Get Me" (John Shanks remix) – 3:16
 "Don't Let Me Get Me" (radio mix) – 3:31
 "Don't Let Me Get Me" (Maurice's Nu Soul Mix) – 6:03
 "Don't Let Me Get Me" (video) – 3:30

UK cassette single
 "Don't Let Me Get Me" (John Shanks remix) – 3:16
 "Don't Let Me Get Me" (radio mix) – 3:31

European CD single
 "Don't Let Me Get Me" (radio mix) – 3:31
 "Don't Let Me Get Me" (John Shanks remix) – 3:16

European maxi-CD single
 "Don't Let Me Get Me" (radio mix) – 3:31
 "Don't Let Me Get Me" (John Shanks remix) – 3:16
 "Don't Let Me Get Me" (Maurice's Nu Soul Mix) – 6:03
 "Get the Party Started/Sweet Dreams" (featuring Redman) – 4:05
 "Don't Let Me Get Me" (video) – 3:30

Australian CD single
 "Don't Let Me Get Me" (radio mix) – 3:31
 "Don't Let Me Get Me" (John Shanks remix) – 3:16
 "There You Go" (live from Sydney) – 3:35
 "Don't Let Me Get Me" (Juicy Horn Mix) – 9:32

Credits and personnel
Credits are taken from the Missundaztood album booklet.

Studios
 Recorded at Pinetree Studios (Miami Beach, Florida) and DARP Studios (Atlanta, Georgia)
 Mixed at Larrabee Studios North (North Hollywood, California)
 Mastered at Hit Factory Mastering (New York City)

Personnel

 Pink – writing, vocals, background vocals
 Dallas Austin – writing, production, arrangement
 Carlton Lynn – recording
 Doug Harms – recording assistant
 Dave Way – mixing
 Tim LeBlanc – mixing assistant
 Rick Sheppard – MIDI and sound design
 Herb Powers Jr. – mastering

Charts and certifications

Weekly charts

Year-end charts

Certifications

Release history

References

2001 songs
2002 singles
Arista Records singles
Bertelsmann Music Group singles
Cultural depictions of Britney Spears
Music videos directed by Dave Meyers (director)
Number-one singles in New Zealand
Pink (singer) songs
Song recordings produced by Dallas Austin
Songs written by Dallas Austin
Songs written by Pink (singer)